Těšovice is a municipality and village in Prachatice District in the South Bohemian Region of the Czech Republic. It has about 300 inhabitants.

Administrative parts
Villages of Běleč and Bělečská Lhota are administrative parts of Těšovice.

References

Villages in Prachatice District